Upton Hall is the headquarters of the British Horological Institute (BHI) in Upton, Newark and Sherwood, Nottinghamshire, England. It has been the headquarters since 1972. It also houses the Museum of Timekeeping consisting of a substantial collection of clocks, watches and also a library. The Museum is open to the public during seasonal summer opening hours, for special events and for pre-booked Group tours.

History
The Hall was built in 1828 by Thomas Wright (1773-1845) a banker of Nottinghamshire. It was designed by the architect W J Donthome.

The hall was purchased in 1895 by John Warwick, a brewer of the firm 'Warwick & Richardson' based in Newark. He used it as a family home. He added a Ballroom, a Billiards Room, and a further six bedrooms. In 1936 the property was bought by Sir Albert Ball, though he never took up residence there.

In 1952 the hall was declared a listed building. It is now a grade II* listed building, making it one of the most treasured 5% of all buildings in the UK.

The property is listed by Historic England as a ' Heritage at Risk'. Roof coverings are in fair condition but rainwater disposal is poor, with corresponding internal dampness and signs of active dry rot. The adjacent stables and courtyard structures contribute to the setting of the hall and are now in very poor condition and all at significant risk of loss.

The building was purchased by the BHI in 1972, where its headquarters have been ever since.

Owners
Thomas and Frances Wright 1828 - 1845
Revd. Joseph Banks Wright and Sophia Wright 1845
Philip Richard Falkner and Alicia Falkner 1857 - 1888
Mary Frances Falkner 1888 - 1894
John Francis Warwick and Eliza Gertrude Warwick 1895 - 1935
Sir Albert Ball 1936 - 1939
Holy Ghost Fathers (Roman Catholic College) 1939 - 1972
British Horological Institute 1972 - current

See also
 Listed building

References

External links
 History of Upton Hall on the BHI's website
 A virtual tour of Upton Hall on the BHI's website

Country houses in Nottinghamshire
Grade II* listed buildings in Nottinghamshire
Upton, Newark and Sherwood
Horology